(Dreaming and being awake), WAB 87, is a song, which Anton Bruckner composed in 1890 to celebrate the 100th anniversary of Franz Grillparzer's birth.

History 

Bruckner composed the song on 15 December 1890. The text is from the end of Act I of Franz Grillparzer's drama .

Bruckner dedicated the composition to his housemate Wilhelm Ritter von Hartel, the rector of the university of Vienna.
 
The piece, of which the original manuscript is stored in the archive of the performing choir, was published in 1891 by Theodor Rättig, Vienna without Bruckner's assignment. 

Because of the encountered performance difficulties (humming voices),  Bruckner revised the composition slightly on 4 February 1892.

Text 

The work uses a text from the end of Act I of Franz Grillparzer's drama  (A dream is life):

Music 
The 75-bar long work in A-B-A' form is scored in A-flat major for  choir and tenor soloist.

The first 24 bars are sung by the choir. On bar 25 ("Und die Liebe, die du fühlest"), the text is taken over in D-flat major by the tenor soloist with accompaniment of humming voices. From bar 44 ("wenn du einst im Grabe ruhst."), the song is taken over by the choir. From bar 52, the choir repeats the first strophe.

Discography 

There are two recordings of Träumen und Wachen:
 Guido Mancusi, Chorus Viennensis, Herbert Lippert (tenor), Musik, du himmlisches Gebilde! – CD: ORF CD 73, 1995
 Thomas Kerbl, Männerchorvereinigung, Michael Nowak (tenor) Weltliche Männerchöre – CD: LIVA054, 2012

References

Sources 
 Anton Bruckner – Sämtliche Werke, Band XXIII/2:  Weltliche Chorwerke (1843–1893), Musikwissenschaftlicher Verlag der Internationalen Bruckner-Gesellschaft, Angela Pachovsky and Anton Reinthaler (Editor), Vienna, 1989
 Cornelis van Zwol, Anton Bruckner 1824–1896 – Leven en werken, uitg. Thoth, Bussum, Netherlands, 2012. 
 Uwe Harten, Anton Bruckner. Ein Handbuch. , Salzburg, 1996. .

External links 
 
 Träumen und Wachen As-Dur, WAB 87 – Critical discography by Hans Roelofs 

Weltliche Chorwerke by Anton Bruckner
1890 compositions
Compositions in A-flat major
Adaptations of works by Franz Grillparzer